Mohamed Fayad is a professor of Computer Engineering at San Jose State University, and author of many publications in the area of software engineering.

Biography

Early life and education

Fayad received his bachelor's degree in Agriculture Engineering from Cairo University, Cairo, Egypt.  He received his Master's and Ph.D. in computer science from the University of Minnesota at Minneapolis, where his research topic was Object Oriented Software Engineering: Problems & Perspectives.  He lives in California.

Career

Fayad was associate professor at the computer science and computer engineering faculty at the University of Nevada, Reno, from 1995 - 1999 and J.D. Edwards Professor, Computer Science & Engineering, at the University of Nebraska, Lincoln, from 1999 to 2002.  Dr. Fayad has more than fifteen years of industrial experience that include ten years as a software architect in many companies, such as McDonnell Douglas and Philips Research Laboratory.

He is the lead author of several classic Wiley books: Transition to Object Oriented Software Development, August 1998, Building Application Frameworks, Sept., 1999, Implementing Application Frameworks, Sept., 1999, Domain-Specific Application Frameworks, Oct., 1999, and several CRC Press, Taylor & Francis Group: Software Patterns, Knowledge Maps, and Domain Analysis, December 2014. He is an IEEE Distinguished Speaker, an associate editor, editorial advisor, a columnist for The Communications of the ACM, where his column is Thinking Objectively, a columnist for Al-Ahram, Egyptians Newspaper, an editor-in-chief for IEEE Computer Society Press - Computer Science and Engineering Practice Press (1995-1997), a general chair of IEEE/Arab Computer Society International Conference on Computer Systems and Applications, AICCSA 2001, Beirut, Lebanon, 2001, and the founder and president of Arab Computer Society, ACS from April 2004 to April 2007. He has been a Full Professor of Computer Engineering at San Jose State University since 2002.

References

External links
http://www.engr.sjsu.edu/fayad/
https://www.researchgate.net/profile/Mohamed_Fayad/

1950 births
Living people
Egyptian computer scientists
American male writers
Cairo University alumni
Egyptian emigrants to the United States
San Jose State University faculty
University of Minnesota College of Science and Engineering alumni
University of Nebraska–Lincoln faculty
University of Nevada, Reno alumni
People from Dakahlia Governorate